A. Paul Vance Fredericktown Regional Airport  is a city-owned, public-use airport located three nautical miles (6 km) north of the central business district of Fredericktown, a city in Madison County, Missouri, United States. It is included in the National Plan of Integrated Airport Systems for 2011–2015, which categorized it as a general aviation airport.

In August 2011, the airport was renamed to honor Paul Vance, a former Navy pilot, flight instructor, corporate pilot, and aeronautics development director for the City of St. Louis. It was previously known as Fredericktown Regional Airport.

Facilities and aircraft 
A. Paul Vance Fredericktown Regional Airport covers an area of 83 acres (34 ha) at an elevation of 880 feet (268 m) above mean sea level. It has one runway designated 1/19 with an asphalt surface measuring 4,000 by 75 feet (1,219 x 23 m).

For the 12-month period ending June 30, 2011, the airport had 2,470 aircraft operations, an average of 205 per month: 97% general aviation, 2% air taxi, and 1% military. At that time, there were 11 aircraft based at this airport: 82% single-engine and 18% multi-engine.

References

External links 
 A. Paul Vance Fredericktown Regional Airport at City of Fredericktown website
  at Missouri DOT airport directory
 Aerial image as of April 1996 from USGS The National Map
 
 

Airports in Missouri
Buildings and structures in Madison County, Missouri